The emblem of the Chinese Communist Party is a stylised version of hammer and sickle. According to Article 53 of the Constitution of the Chinese Communist Party, "the Party emblem and flag are the symbol and sign of the Communist Party of China."

History 
At the beginning of its history, the Chinese Communist Party did not have a single official standard for the flag, but instead allowed individual party committees to copy the flag of the Communist Party of the Soviet Union. On 28 April 1942, the Central Politburo decreed the establishment of a sole official flag. "The flag of the Communist Party of China has the length-to-width proportion of 3:2 with a hammer and sickle in the upper-left corner, and with no five-pointed star. The Political Bureau authorizes the General Office to custom-make a number of standard flags and distribute them to all major organs".

On 21 September 1996, the CCP General Office issued "Regulations on the Production and Use of the Communist Party of China Flag and Emblem", which stated that the emblem and flag were the official symbols and signs of the party.

Design 
According to People's Daily, "The standard party flag is 120 centimeters (cm) in length and 80 cm in width. In the center of the upper-left corner (a quarter of the length and width to the border) is a yellow hammer-and-sickle 30 cm in diameter. The flag sleeve (pole hem) is in white and 6.5 cm in width. The dimension of the pole hem is not included in the measurement of the flag. In total, the flag has five dimensions, the sizes are "no. 1: 288 cm in length and 192 cm in width; no. 2: 240 cm in length and 160 cm in width; no. 3: 192 cm in length and 128 cm in width; no. 4: 144 cm in length and 96 cm in width; no. 5: 96 cm in length and 64 cm in width."

Symbolism 
According to the Chinese government, "hammer and sickle together symbolise the working tools of workers and farmers. The emblem in general symbolizes that the Chinese Communist Party is the vanguard of the Chinese working class, and it represents the fundamental interests of the working class and the big majority of the Chinese people."

Gallery

See also
National Emblem of the People's Republic of China
Blue Sky with a White Sun

References 

Chinese Communist Party
Flags of Asia
Flags of organizations
National symbols of the People's Republic of China